Milda is a Lithuanian and Latvian feminine given name. The associated name day is May 11.

People named Milda include:
Milda Dorethea Prytz (1891–1977), Norwegian chemist
Milda Sauliūtė (born 1981), Lithuanian professional basketball player
Milda Valčiukaitė (born 1994), Lithuanian rower

References

Latvian feminine given names
Lithuanian feminine given names